Kazadi Kasengu (born 20 July 1992) is an DR Congolese professional footballer who plays as a forward for [Singida Big Stars FC] in Tanzania

International career

International goals
Scores and results list DR Congo's goal tally first.

References

External links
 
 
 

1992 births
Living people
Democratic Republic of the Congo footballers
Democratic Republic of the Congo international footballers
Association football forwards
AS Vita Club players
Wydad AC players
Footballers from Kinshasa
21st-century Democratic Republic of the Congo people